The 1982–83 Scottish Inter-District Championship was a rugby union competition for Scotland's district teams.

This season saw the 30th Scottish Inter-District Championship.

South won the competition with 4 wins.

1982-83 League Table

Results

Round 1

Anglo-Scots: 

North and Midlands:

Round 2

Anglo-Scots: 

Glasgow District: 

North and Midlands: 

Anglo-Scots:

Round 3

Edinburgh District: 

Glasgow District: 

North and Midlands: 

South of Scotland:

Round 4

South of Scotland: 

Edinburgh District:

Round 5

Glasgow District: 

South of Scotland: 

Edinburgh District:

Anglo-Scots:

Round 6

South of Scotland: 

Anglo-Scots: 

Glasgow District: 

North and Midlands:

Matches outwith then Championship

English matches

Northumberland: 

Glasgow District:

References

1982–83 in Scottish rugby union
1982–83